The 1988 Donington Superbike World Championship round was the opening round of the 1988 Superbike World Championship season and the first ever in the series. It took place on 3 April 1988 at the Donington circuit in Great Britain.

Report
The first grand prix in the history of the Superbike World Championship took place on April 3, 1988, on the 3.149 km National Circuit layout of Donington Park. 45 riders participated in qualifying, with pole position initially going to Doug Polen of the Yoshimura Suzuki team, but he, along with teammate Scott Gray, were disqualified (and deprived of the opportunity to participate in either race) because their bikes were found to have a cubic volume of 765 cm3, against the imposed limit of 750 cm3. This arose from the fact that the AMA Superbike regulations (the championship in which Polen and Gray raced) allowed this through "overboring" of the Suzuki's cylinders, while the World Superbike regulations were more rigid. With the exclusion of Polen from the starting grid, pole was inherited by Roger Burnett, who became the first rider to take pole position in a World Superbike race.

In the first race, 40 riders (the maximum allowed) lined up, but only 39 left the grid; rider Peter Häfner unable to take the start. The first race was won by Davide Tardozzi on a Bimota, despite having to manually restart the electronic injection system a few laps from the finish. The 1981 FIM 500cc World Champion Marco Lucchinelli finished second on the lone Ducati in the field, while Joey Dunlop finished third.

Only riders who made it to at least half distance in the first race were allowed to compete in the second, therefore only 31 riders were allowed to take the start, however only 30 did so. In the second race, Tardozzi and Lucchinelli once again fought for the top two positions, with the battle only being decided when Tardozzi crashed just after Starkey's Bridge on the final lap. Three-time AMA Superbike champion Fred Merkel would take second, and Burnett third.

Due to the points system being based on the combined results of the two races, Tardozzi's final lap crash would prevent him from scoring any points, despite his win in the first race. From the next round at Hungary onwards, half points would be awarded, but now for each race.

Classification

Race 1

Race 2

Combined results
Only riders that finished both races were included.

References

1988 Superbike World Championship season
1988 in British motorsport
April 1988 sports events in the United Kingdom